is a 2006 Japanese movie directed by Isamu Nakae and starring Yūya Yagira and Erika Sawajiri.

Plot
Recently graduated from high school, 17-year-old Shiro (Yūya Yagira) decides to put off college and work at a gas station instead.  Shy and introspective, Shiro understands he is at a turning point of his life, but is unsure of what lies ahead.  Though his parents disapprove of his decision, he has the support of his flower child grandmother (Natsuki Mari) who declares that a gas station is a romantic place for life's drifters.  Surely enough, soon a new co-worker, college student Noriko (Erika Sawajiri), drifts into Shiro's life.  He falls headfirst into a bittersweet first love that ushers him into the world of adulthood.

Cast
 Yūya Yagira - Shiro Yamashita
 Erika Sawajiri - Noriko Watanabe
 Mari Natsuki - Grandma
 Chen Bolin - Mike
 Yo Oizumi - Gas Station Guy
 Ryō Kimura as Makkī
 Gaku Hamada as Naoki
 Mayuko Iwasa as Yoko
 Yū Aoi (cameo)

Production
Released theatrically on 16 September 2006 under the sub-title What little girls are made of.

Sugar and Spice was also released as a DVD in March 2007 with English subtitles.

Reception
Critic Kevin Ma calls the film a "bittersweet romance that's more bitter than sweet" but surprisingly involving for a two-hour film, concluding that it is "an appealing film with photogenic stars, but a story that's hard to relate to.

References

External links
 

2006 films
Toho films
2000s Japanese films